Elena Urkizu Sáez (born January 29, 1975 in Guipúzcoa) is a former field hockey defender from Spain. She represented her native country at two consecutive Olympic Games: in 1996 and 2000. At her last try she finished fourth with the Spanish national team, after a 2–0 loss in the bronze medal game against the Netherlands. Urkizu played club hockey for Real Sociedad.

References

External links
 

1975 births
Living people
Sportspeople from San Sebastián
Spanish female field hockey players
Olympic field hockey players of Spain
Field hockey players at the 1996 Summer Olympics
Field hockey players at the 2000 Summer Olympics
Field hockey players from the Basque Country (autonomous community)